Trip on This: The Remixes is a remix album by the Belgian dance act Technotronic, released in 1990. While it is mainly made up of remixes from the previous year's Pump Up the Jam: The Album, it also contains new tracks and all mixes are exclusive to this album.

The album features a number of high-profile remixers and producers including Shep Pettibone, David Morales, the Dust Brothers, Bernard Sumner, Todd Terry, Kenny "Dope" Gonzalez, Junior Vasquez, and Mastermixers Unity.

As well as featuring remixed versions of four singles from Technotronic's previous album, Trip on This also includes a remix of the hit single from earlier in the year "Spin That Wheel" (originally released under the pseudonym Hi tek 3) and two further singles were taken from the album including "Megamix" which reached number 1 on the Eurochart Hot 100, reaching the Top 10 in the UK, Ireland, Switzerland, Germany and France.

The album was released in the United Kingdom by compilation specialist Telstar Records and reached number 7 in the UK Albums Chart. In the UK it was certified Silver and was certified Gold in Canada.

Track listing

International version 
 "Techno Medley" (Pettibone Mix) – 8:32 (Kamosi, Bogaert)
 "Spin That Wheel" (Morales Spinster Mix) – 5:35 (Ya Kid K, Kovali, El Sati)
 "This Beat Is Technotronic" (Dust Mix) – 4:14 (Martin, Bogaert)
 "Get Up" (Happy Jack Remix) – 7:18 (Kamosi, Bogaert)
 "Raw Update" – 5:08 (Bogaert)
 "Turn it Up" – 5:28 (Einstein, Melissa, Bogaert)
 "Rockin' Over the Beat" (Rockin' Over Manchester Hacienda Mix) – 6:33 (Bogaert, Kamosi)
 "Pump Up the Jam" (Terry Dome Mix) – 5:26 (Kamosi, Bogaert)
 "Take It Slow" (Fab Bibulous Mix) – 5:17 (Kamosi, Bogaert)
 "Megamix" (Hit Radio Version) – 4:18 (Kamosi, Martin, Bogaert)

US version 
 "Techno Medley" (Pettibone Mix) – 8:32 (Kamosi, Bogaert)
 "Spin That Wheel" (Morales Spinster Mix) – 5:35 (Ya Kid K, Kovali, El Sati)
 "This Beat Is Technotronic" (Dust Mix) – 4:14 (Martin, Bogaert)
 "Get Up" (Happy Jack Remix) – 7:18 (Kamosi, Bogaert)
 "Rockin' Over the Beat" (Rockin' Over Manchester Hacienda Mix) – 6:33 (Bogaert, Kamosi)
 "Pump Up the Jam" (Terry Dome Mix) – 5:26 (Kamosi, Bogaert)
 "Take It Slow" (Fab Bibulous Mix) – 5:17 (Kamosi, Bogaert)
 "Raw Update" – 5:08 (Bogaert)
 "Techno Medley" (Pettibone Mix) – 4:00 (Kamosi, Bogaert)

Personnel

Musicians
Manuela "Ya Kid K" Kamosi – vocals
Eric "MC Eric" Martin – vocals
Melissa Beckford – vocals
Colin "Einstein" Case – vocals
Jo Bogaert – instruments and programming
Additional programming and instrumentation on remixes

Production
Produced by Jo Bogaert for ARS Entertainment Belgium
Additional production and remixing on most tracks

Charts

Certifications and sales

References

External links
  Retrieved: 2013-07-10.
  Retrieved: 2013-07-10.

1990 remix albums
Technotronic albums
House music albums by Belgian artists
SBK Records albums